The Roman Catholic Diocese of Orlu is a diocese located in the city of Orlu in the Ecclesiastical province of the Roman Catholic Archdiocese of Owerri in Nigeria.

History
 November 29, 1980: Established as Diocese of Orlu from the Diocese of Owerri

Special churches
The Cathedral is Holy Trinity Cathedral in Orlu.

Bishops
 Bishops of Orlu (Roman rite)
 Bishop Gregory Ochiagha (1980-2008)
 Bishop Augustine T. Ukwuoma (since June, 2008)

Other priest of this diocese who became bishop
Brian Udaigwe, appointed nuncio and titular archbishop in 2013

See also
Roman Catholicism in Nigeria

External links
 www.orludiocese.org
 GCatholic.org Information
 Catholic Hierarchy

Roman Catholic dioceses in Nigeria
Christian organizations established in 1980
Roman Catholic dioceses and prelatures established in the 20th century
1980 establishments in Nigeria
Roman Catholic Ecclesiastical Province of Owerri